Eupithecia inepta is a moth in the  family Geometridae, described by Prout in 1922. It is found on the Juan Fernandez Islands in Chile. The habitat consists of the Northern Valdivian Forest Biotic Province.

The length of the forewings is about 10.5-11.5 mm for females. The forewings are white, with brown scaling along the costa and with scattered pale ochraceous scales, the latter forming a number of slender lines. The hindwings are concolorous with the forewings and have a similar pattern. Adults have been recorded on wing in March.

References

Moths described in 1922
inepta
Moths of South America
Endemic fauna of Chile